Trieres is a genus of beetles belonging to the family Elateridae.

The genus was described in 1900 by Ernest Candèze.

Species:
 Trieres ramitarsus Candèze, 1900

References

Elateridae
Elateridae genera